The Chenal du Four is a waterway off the coast of Brittany in north-western France, in the area of Porspoder, between Pointe Saint-Mathieu and the Island of Béniguet. It is marked by six lighthouses including the Saint-Mathieu Lighthouse and the Kermorvan Lighthouse. The passage maintains a depth of at least  at low tide, and is the usual path taken by yachts sailing between the English Channel with the western coast of France.

See also 
 List of canals in France
 List of waterways

References 

Bodies of water of France